Roundabout is a television movie, or rather a live television play, which aired on Australian television in 1957. Broadcast 4 January 1957 on ABC station ABV-2, it is notable as the first example of television drama produced in Melbourne.

It was made at a time when Australian drama production was rare.

"Official" television broadcasting in the city had only begun two months earlier. There seems to have been a Melbourne production and a Sydney production, as happened with The Twelve Pound Look.

Plot
The original TV listing in The Age newspaper described the plot as "a woman's reactions to her husband's suspected affair with another woman".

Melbourne Cast
British actor Patrick Horgan
Mary Ward as the wife
Beverley Dunn as the other woman
Sydney Conabere
Mira Carleton

Production
The show is based on a 1952 one-act play by Michael Clayton-Hutton.

A Melbourne production was aired live on 4 January 1957 over 30 minutes. Production was by Bill Eldridge.  Filming took place at ABC's studios at Rippon Lea. Star Patrick Horgan was appearing on stage at the time and had to get in a taxi to the theatre after filming. Beverly Dunn went on to appear in a number of live TV productions.

Sydney production

A Sydney production was directed by Raymond Menmuir and aired February 19, 1957.

Cast
Roger Climpson as David  
Anne Bullen as Ruth
Judith Godden as Paula

See also
The Passionate Pianist
Box for One
Tomorrow's Child
Ending It
The Shadow of Doubt
List of live television plays broadcast on Australian Broadcasting Corporation (1950s)

References

External links
Roundabout at IMDb

1957 television plays
1950s Australian television plays
Australian Broadcasting Corporation original programming
English-language television shows
Black-and-white Australian television shows
Australian live television shows